Dormagen station is a station in the city of Dormagen in the German state of North Rhine-Westphalia, on the Sülz Valley Railway. It is served by the Rhein-Münsterland-Express (RE 7), operated hourly, and S-Bahn line S 11, operated at 20-minute intervals. It has four platform tracks.

References

Railway stations in North Rhine-Westphalia
1855 establishments in Prussia
Railway stations in Germany opened in 1855
Rhine-Ruhr S-Bahn stations
S11 (Rhine-Ruhr S-Bahn)
Buildings and structures in Rhein-Kreis Neuss